Melanolepis vitifolia is a small tropical forest tree, endemic to Vietnam and Cambodia, in the family Euphorbiaceae.

Description
As its name suggests, Melanolepis vitifolia has a grapevine-shaped leaf in contrast with its more widespread relative M. multiglandulosa.  This species always has more deeply divided 3-palmatifid leaves, with an absence of teeth along the leaf margins and they are also more hairy than M. multiglandulosa.

References

External links

Chrozophoreae
Flora of Vietnam